Fernando Risi was an Italian cinematographer.

Selected filmography
 The Confessions of a Woman (1928)
 Queen of the Night (1931)
 Television (1931)
 The Doctor's Secret (1931)
 No Man's Land (1939)
 Antonio Meucci (1940)
 Saint John, the Beheaded (1940)
 The Brambilla Family Go on Holiday (1941)
 The Beggar's Daughter (1950)
 Beauties on Bicycles (1951)
 Black Feathers (1952)
 The Phantom Musketeer (1952)
 If You Won a Hundred Million (1953)

References

Bibliography 
 Waldman, Harry. Missing Reels: Lost Films of American and European Cinema. McFarland, 2000.

External links 
 

1890 births
Year of death unknown
Italian cinematographers
Film people from Rome